Biggs Furniture, based in Richmond, Virginia, United States, was once a leading U.S. manufacturer of colonial reproduction furniture. The company flourished in the 20th century, alongside reproductions by Colonial Williamsburg by the Kittinger Company, and other mass market reproduction brands like Ethan Allen and Pennsylvania House. In 1975, the company was purchased by the Kittinger Company.

The restored manufacturing plant at 900 West Marshall Street in Richmond is now an apartment complex. Examples of the furniture were in homes and in public buildings such as the Hotel John Marshall and Miller & Rhoads Tea Room.

The company was one of many Virginia furniture makers of the 20th century.

References

Manufacturing companies based in Richmond, Virginia
Furniture companies of the United States